Asaf Ali (11 May 1888 – 2 April 1953) was an Indian independence fighter and noted Indian lawyer. He was the first Indian Ambassador to the United States. He also served as the Governor of Odisha.

Education
Asaf Ali was educated at St. Stephen's College, Delhi. He was called to bar from Lincoln's Inn in England.

Indian National Movement
In 1914, the British attack on the Ottoman Empire had a large effect on the Indian Muslim community. Asaf Ali supported the Turkish side and resigned from the Privy Council. He saw this as an act of non-cooperation and returned to India in December 1914. Upon his return to India, Asaf Ali became heavily involved in the nationalist movement.

He was elected to the Central Legislative Assembly in 1935 as a member of the Muslim Nationalist Party. He then became significant as a Congress member and was appointed deputy leader.

The last of several spells of imprisonment which Asaf Ali courted during the freedom movement was in the wake of the 'Quit India' resolution adopted by the All India Congress Committee in August 1942. He was detained at Ahmednagar Fort jail along with Jawaharlal Nehru and other members of the Congress Working Committee.

Post 1946

He was in charge of the Railways and Transport in the Interim Government of India headed by Jawaharlal Nehru from 2 September 1946. He served as the first Indian Ambassador to the United States from February 1947 to mid-April 1947.

Post independence 
Asaf Ali was first Indian Ambassador to United States. He was appointed governor of Odisha for two terms and later, Indian Ambassador to Switzerland.

Legal career
Asaf Ali rose to become one of the most respected lawyers in the country. He defended Batukeshwar Dutt as a lawyer.

In 1945, Ali came to be the convener of the INA defence team established by the Congress for the defense of the officers of the Indian National Army charged with treason later in November 1945.

Bhagat Singh was charged with attempt to murder under section 307 of the Indian Penal Code. Asaf Ali, a member of the Congress Party was his lawyer.

Personal life
In 1928, he married Aruna Asaf Ali, a marriage that raised eyebrows on the grounds of religion (Asaf Ali was a Muslim while Aruna was a Hindu) and age difference (Aruna was 20 years junior to him). She is widely remembered for hoisting the Indian National Congress flag at the Gowalia Tank maidan in Bombay during the Quit India Movement, 1942. Later Aruna Asaf Ali was honored with India's highest civilian award, Bharat Ratna, for her work.

Death and legacy
Ali died in office in Bern on 2 April 1953, while serving as India's ambassador to Switzerland. In 1989, India Post brought out a stamp in his honor.

References

External links

 

1888 births
1953 deaths
Indian National Army trials
Indian independence activists from Uttar Pradesh
Delhi politicians
St. Stephen's College, Delhi alumni
Indian civil servants
20th-century Indian Muslims
Politicians from Allahabad
Governors of Odisha
Ambassadors of India to the United States
Members of the Central Legislative Assembly of India
Members of the Constituent Assembly of India
20th-century Indian lawyers
Indian National Congress politicians from Uttar Pradesh
Scholars from Allahabad
Ambassadors of India to the Holy See